Kocherlakota or Kocharlakota is one of the Indian surnames.

 Kocherlakota Narayana, American economist and president of the Federal Reserve Bank of Minneapolis
 Kotcherlakota Rangadhama Rao (1898–1972), Indian physicist
 Koccharlakota Satyanarayana (1915–1969), Telugu film actor and playback singer